Spring Break 4…Suntan City is the fifth extended play (EP) by American country music artist Luke Bryan. It was released on March 6, 2012 by Capitol Nashville.

Critical reception
Billy Dukes of Taste of Country gave the song two stars out of five, saying that "If you’ve got spring break plans that involve suntan lotion and sexy strangers willing to rub it in, Bryan has your soundtrack. The truth is, most people stay home and work or hang out with family over the spring break vacation. Play this album into any other from the singer's catalog... and it becomes obvious the recording was tossed together quickly. It that way, it is sort of like Spring Break."

Track listing

Chart performance

Weekly charts

Year-end charts

References

2012 EPs
Luke Bryan EPs
Capitol Records EPs